The 2015 USL Playoffs was a postseason tournament following the 2015 United Soccer League regular season, the first since the league rebranded for the 2015 season. Including USL Pro history, it is the fourth postseason tournament. The tournament began on September 25 and will last until October 16.

Twelve teams (top 6 per conference) will compete, up from 8 the last 3 seasons. Teams will be seeded one through six in each conference, with the two highest seeds earning a bye to the conference semifinals. The third seed will host the sixth seed, while the fourth seed will host the fifth seed in a single-elimination match. The winners will face the second and first seed, respectively, in the conference semifinals.

The conference semifinal winners will play against each other in the Conference Championship, which will serve as the overall semifinals for the playoff. The winners of the Eastern and Western Conference Championship will play for the championship.

The winner of the playoffs will be crowned league champion.

USL Conference standings 
The top 6 teams from each conference advance to the USL playoffs.

Eastern Conference

Western Conference

Bracket

Schedule

First round

Conference Semifinals

Conference Finals

USL Championship

Championship Game MVP: Asani Samuels (ROC)

Top goalscorers

References 

playoffs
USL Championship Playoffs